Juraj Kakaš (born June 17, 1971 in Bratislava, Czechoslovakia) is a former soccer goalkeeper.

Career
Slovan Bratislava (champion 1993 and 1994), Spartak Trnava, Artmedia Bratislava, Rimavska Sobota. Goalkeeper of the year in Slovakia 1997, and SC Ashdod (Israel), Coach of Goalkeepers, UEFA B licence holder, coach in Slovan Bratislava (Slovakia), AC Milan Academy Sydney (Australia), Coerver Vancouver (Canada), BedHead FC (UK), Sussex House school Chelsea (UK), Tottenham Hotspur ladies (UK)

References

1971 births
Living people
Slovak footballers
ŠK Slovan Bratislava players
FC Spartak Trnava players
FC Petržalka players
MŠK Rimavská Sobota players
F.C. Ashdod players
Israeli Premier League players
Slovak expatriate footballers
Expatriate footballers in Israel
Slovak expatriate sportspeople in Israel
Footballers from Bratislava
Association football goalkeepers